Capital punishment for juveniles in the United States existed until March 2, 2005, when the U.S. Supreme Court ruled it unconstitutional in Roper v. Simmons. Prior to Roper, there were 71 people on death row in the United States for crimes committed as juveniles.

History

Pre-Furman 

Since 1642, in the Thirteen Colonies, the United States under the Articles of Confederation, and the United States under the Constitution, an estimated 364 juveniles have been put to death by the individual states (colonies, before 1776) and the federal government.

The youngest person to be executed in the 20th century was Joe Persons, a boy executed in Georgia in 1915 at the age of 14 for the rape of an 8-year-old girl that he committed when he was only 13. The second youngest person to be executed was George Stinney, who was electrocuted in South Carolina at the age of 14 on June 16, 1944, after the bodies of two children (ages 7 and 11) were found close to his home. George Stinney maintained his innocence throughout his trial and subsequent execution. The verdict of this case was overturned posthumously. The third youngest person to be executed in the 20th century was Fortune Ferguson in 1927 for rape in Florida. The youngest person ever to be sentenced to death in the United States was James Arcene, a Native American, for his role in a robbery and murder committed when he was ten years old. He was, however, 23 years old when he was actually executed on June 18, 1885. The last judicially-approved execution of a juvenile was convicted murderer Leonard Shockley, who died in a Maryland gas chamber on April 10, 1959, at the age of 17. No one has been under the age of 19 at the time of execution since at least 1964.

Post-Furman 

Since the reinstatement of the death penalty in 1976 when the Supreme Court ruled that the death penalty did not violate the Eighth Amendment's prohibition against cruel and unusual punishment, 22 people have been executed for crimes committed while they were under the age of 18.  All of the 22 executed individuals were males. Twenty-one of them were age 17 when the crime occurred; one, Sean Sellers (executed on February 4, 1999, in Oklahoma), was 16 years old when he murdered his mother, stepfather, and a store clerk. Due to the slow process of appeals since 1976, none were actually under the age of 18 at the time of execution.

In Thompson v. Oklahoma (1988), the Supreme Court first held unconstitutional imposition of the death penalty for crime committed aged 15 or younger. But in the 1989 case Stanford v. Kentucky, it upheld capital punishment for crimes committed aged 16 or 17. Justice Scalia's plurality part of his opinion famously criticized Justice Brennan's dissent by accusing it of "replac[ing] judges of the law with a committee of philosopher-kings". Justice O'Connor was the key vote in both cases, being the lone justice to concur in the two.

Sixteen years later, Roper v. Simmons overruled Stanford. Justice Kennedy, who concurred with Scalia's opinion in Stanford, instead wrote the opinion of the court in Roper and became the key vote. Justice O'Connor dissented.

Before 2005, of the 38 U.S. states that allowed capital punishment:
19 states and the federal government had set a minimum age of 18,
5 states had set a minimum age of 17, and
14 states had explicitly set a minimum age of 16, or were subject to the Supreme Court's imposition of that minimum.

At the time of the Roper v. Simmons decision, there were 71 juveniles awaiting execution on death row: 13 in Alabama; four in Arizona; three in Florida; two in Georgia; four in Louisiana; five in Mississippi; one in Nevada; four in North Carolina; two in Pennsylvania; three in South Carolina; 29 in Texas; and one in Virginia.

Few juveniles have ever been executed for their crimes. Even when juveniles were sentenced to death, few executions were actually carried out. In the United States for example, youths under the age of 18 were executed at a rate of 20–27 per decade, or about 1.6–2.3% of all executions from 1880s to the 1920s. This has dropped significantly when only 3 juveniles were executed between January 1977 and November 1986.

List of juveniles executed in the United States since 1976 
All juveniles executed since 1976 were male.

See also 
 Capital punishment in the United States
 Furman v. Georgia, United States Supreme Court decision that temporarily abolished capital punishment in the U.S.
 Gregg v. Georgia
 Roper v. Simmons
 Stanford v. Kentucky
 Thompson v. Oklahoma

References

External links 
 Juveniles: Death Penalty Worldwide Academic research database on the laws, practice, and statistics of capital punishment for every death penalty country in the world.
 Death Penalty Information Center – The Juvenile Death Penalty Prior to Roper v. Simmons
 Capital Punishment

1642 establishments in the Thirteen Colonies
2005 disestablishments in the United States
United States
Juveniles